Robbie West (born 7 March 1969) is a former Australian rules footballer who played for the West Coast Eagles and Footscray in the Australian Football League (AFL).

Originally from Wodonga, Victoria, he then played with Western Australian Football League (WAFL) club West Perth, West was drafted by West Coast at the 1990 AFL Draft and made his AFL debut in the 1991 AFL season. West was unable to break into West Coast's strong side, managed just three games in each of his first two seasons, instead playing most of his football with West Perth, winning the Sandover Medal for best and fairest player in the WAFL as well as West Perth's Fairest and Best award.

West's most successful year in the AFL came in 1993 when he played 10 games and the following year he crossed to Footscray for one season.

In 1995 he joined South Australian National Football League (SANFL) club Port Adelaide, playing 25 games, playing in Port's premiership team, and winning the club's best and fairest award.  West was the victim of an assault in late 1995 that left him fighting for his life.  West recovered and after rehabilitation played for Port Adelaide again in 1997, playing seven league games and 14 reserves games. Not surprisingly, West never regained his form of 1995, but it was a major feat that he was able to recover and return to league football.

Personal life
West's son, Connor West was drafted to West Coast in the 2021 mid-season rookie draft, and made his debut in round 18 of the 2021 season.

References

Robbie West's player profile at The Power From Port

1969 births
Living people
Western Bulldogs players
West Coast Eagles players
West Perth Football Club players
Sandover Medal winners
Port Adelaide Football Club (SANFL) players
Port Adelaide Magpies players
Port Adelaide Football Club players (all competitions)
Australian rules footballers from Victoria (Australia)
People from Wodonga